Paterwa may refer to:

Paterwa, Janakpur, Nepal
Paterwa, Narayani, Nepal
Paterwa, Sagarmatha, Nepal